Encantadia is a Filipino fantasy franchise produced and published by GMA Network. It consists of four television series that have run from 2005 to present and a single film. The first was shown in 2005 carrying the title alone and ended in the same year with total of 160 episodes. The second series title Etheria premiered in the same year and ended in 2006 with 50 episodes. Due to its significant success, the third series title Encantadia: Pag-ibig Hanggang Wakas premiered in 2006 consisting of 48 episodes. In 2016, 11 years after the original run, a reboot of the series premiered on the same network featuring a new cast. In 2005, Encantadia had a crossover film with Mulawin entitled Mulawin: The Movie, which was produced by GMA Pictures as an entry to the 2005 Metro Manila Film Festival.

Production

Development
Encantadia is a term coined from the Filipino words "enkanto", "enkanta", "enkantada", or "enkantado", which was in turn derived from the Spanish term encant(ad)o/a, which means enchanted beings endowed with supernatural powers. The series was created by GMA Network, the same network that produced the fantasy-themed series Mulawin and Darna. It was directed by Mark Reyes and Gil Tejada, Jr., and written by Suzette Doctolero. Originally, the series was intended as GMA Films' entry to the 2004 Metro Manila Film Festival but they later decided to make Encantadia a daily fantasy soap opera due to its huge production and budget. Encantadia was Doctolero's first head writing project with the network in 2005, and also served as her training for writing a fantasy story for the first time. According to her, it was inspired by the story of Maria Makiling, a diwata (fairy) in Philippine folklore, in four different persona. It was also inspired by different stories around the world combined into one. The first three installment were consecutively shown from 2005 to 2006. In 2010, a second saga or fourth installment was scheduled to be produced by GMA Network, but it was not push through until Atty Gozon, CEO of GMA Network pushed it back for 2012, but was scrapped. In 2015,the director, producer and the writer were given a go signal by the network to make the new Encantadia. In January 2016, it was announced that the fourth installment will be a reboot (often called as requel or retelling-sequel) of the old series .

Setting
According to Mark Reyes, the sets of Encantadia in 2005 are located in various places in the Philippines. The Kingdom of Adamya is located at Calatagan, Batangas. The cave set of Hathorian Kingdom is located at the Kalinawan Cave in Tanay, Rizal. Lireo's forest is located at Daranak Falls and Batlag Falls in Rizal. A 1,900 square meter warehouse in Pasig served as an indoor set with an improvised pond. The said warehouse was also a setting change for Lireo, Sapiro, Hera Andal, Hera Sensa and others. The Kingdom of Sapiro set is located inside the historic walled city of Intramuros (Old Manila) in the heart of Manila. In its second and third installment, the series used the same locations.

In 2016, a 3000 square meter warehouse in Makati was converted to a set for the Lireo Kingdom and its forest. The fallen Sapiro Kingdom and the Island of Cassiopeia were shot in Fortune Island in Batangas. Another warehouse set was converted as the Kingdom of Hathoria, while the mortal world were shot in various locations around Manila. The forest of Encantadia were shot in Tanay, Rizal, Pundaquit in Zambales as well as Batlag Falls and Daranak Falls.

Musical scoring
The main theme of the series is its own soundtrack titled "Tadhana"(destiny) described as a chant/hymn, composed and sung by Filipino folk singer Bayang Barrios. According to Barrios, when she arrived in the recording studio, the hymn structure was already done by Allan Feliciano. The chant's theme is inspired by a drought and deforestation. One of the factors that contributed to the success of the 2005 series is its musical scoring, it was highly commended in the 2005 Asian Television Awards for "Best Original Music Score". In the sequel, Etheria, aside from "Tadhana", Feliciano also arranged a soundtrack titled as "Hade!!" (to attack) which refer as the Etherian war song; sung also by Barrios. Unlike "Tadhana", it is a lyrical song formed in Enchanta. Based on the lyrics, the song is about the creation of Encantadia, the five kingdoms including Etheria, and warfare. In the end, the composer appears to question the unending violence in the land including the lack of love and peace. Sub-tracks were also included in the series such as "Asshenti", an Etherian love song sung by Barrios and the Lirean Hymn, "Ivo"(life) arranged by Ariel Hugo, which was sung by Karylle. In the 2016 series, it uses the main soundtrack "Tadhana", which was modernized and beat has been altered to a rock-twist to fit the new generation. Moreover, "Ivo" was also used as recorded by Gabbi Garcia.

"Ang Mahiwagang Puso" (Enchanted Heart) written by Tats Faustino, sung by Karylle and Jerome John Hughes was used as a soundtrack to the original version of the series. Karylle also recorded "Hiling" (Wish) but was rarely used in the series. "Pangarap ni Lira" (Lira's wish), composed by Suzette Doctolero, arranged by Eric Torralba and sung by Jennylyn Mercado was also part of the soundtrack. Other soundtracks include "Isang Bagong Mundo" (A whole new world) performed by Jennylyn Mercado, arranged by Eric Torralba and written by Suzette Doctolero; "Sa Pakpak ng Paru-paro" (Fairy's Wings) composed by Mark A. Reyes and arranged by Eric Torralba.

"Maghihintay Ako" (I'll Be Waiting), sung by Gabbi Garcia and Christian Bautista and "Sa Pangarap Lang" (Through a Dream) sung by Mikee Quintos are being used in the 2016 series. Mikee Quintos also recorded "Ang Awit ni Lira" (Lira's Hymn) for the requel.

Overview
Encantadia is an enchanted realm inhabited by a race of magical Elf-like beings called Encantados. It was created thousand years ago by five deities Haliya, Arde, Emre, Keros and Ether, who were referred to as bathala (Gods) in present times. The world they created was settled by a primitive race of humans called "barbaro". The Bathala then created a caste system to distinguish each race: the diwata's (fairies) of the Kingdom of Lireo; mystical creatures of the Adamyan territory; the warriors and healers called Sapiryans of the Kingdom of Sapiro; and the blacksmiths of the Kingdom of Hathoria. The four kingdoms were thus formed and they worshipped Emre, the greatest of the Bathala. Emre's dominion over Encantadia prompted a jealous Arde and Ether to assassinate him. Emre discovered their plan and cursed both of them: Arde became a dragon and was sent to guard valaak (hell) while Ether was turned into a giant snake as a reminder of her treachery. Emre's punishment of the two Bathala divided Encantadia's inhabitants into several factions based on the gods they worship. Most encantados followed Ether and established the Kingdom of Etheria, which came to dominate Encantadia with an iron fist until its Queen Avria was deposed by the four resurgent kingdoms to restore peace and stability.

The Gods
 Cassiopeia - Former queen of the fairies and first keeper of the whole Mother Gem. She endured many trials to ascend as a new goddess to replace Ether.
 Emre – One of the Supreme Bathalas of Encantadia. He resides in Devas, the home of the blessed dead. He was originally the Bathala of Spirituality and of Time and Space. He created the Mother Gem to protect Encantados from Etheria and the magic of Ether. 
 Keros – The Bathala of Destruction. Without him, nothing will be destroyed and that will outbalance the World of Encantadia. Everything he touches gets destroyed. He formerly resided in Binyaan, a dead island away from the continent of Encantadia. He was killed by Arde, and his soul will go back to the realm of high heavens. 
 Haliya – The Bathaluman of the Two Moons. She is one of the five Bathalas and Bathalumans who created the world of Encantadia. She has a powerful Trident called De'jar, it means Cursed. She was originally the Bathala of Wisdom and the Mind.
 Ether – Originally the Bathaluman of Creation, Physicality and Being. She is one of the Bathalas who planned to kill Emre because of her envy of the encantados worshipping Emre. She was cursed and turned into a giant snake, which reminds every encantado about her treachery. She created the Empire of Etheria, led by Avria and planned to take over ancient Encantadia. Ether resurrected her ancient fallen empire in the present to create a divine coup and take Emre's throne in Devas. 
 Arde – The Bathala of Bala'ak (Hell). Originally he was the Bathala of Emotions, Energy, and Transformation. One of the Bathalas who planned to kill Emre. He was a cohort and lover of Ether. He was cursed and turned into a dragon, and sent into Bala'ak, Encantadia's hell and underworld.

The Kingdoms

 Sapiro – A kingdom in the northern valley of Encantadia; protector of the gemstone of earth. Their kingdom has the most fertile land in the whole of Encantadia
 Hathoria – A kingdom in the west of Encantadia; protector of the gemstone of fire. Originally a fertile land but became a barren wasteland because of the heavy industrialization of Hathoria. It is surrounded by volcanoes that give their kingdom an abundance of minerals underground that they use for their war machinery.
 Lireo – A kingdom in the east of Encantadia and is home to the royal blood diwatas; protector of the gemstone of air. It is located on top of the Eastern Mountains of Encantadia. A futuristic looking matriarchal queendom that is powered by windmills. It is the home of the temple of Emre.
 Adamya – A former Kingdom in the south of Encantadia; protector of the gemstone of water. It is an archipelago surrounded by the Southern Adamyan Ocean. It is the only unfortified territory in Encantadia. It has lush forests and many seashores. 
 Etheria – The fallen empire of Encantadia; It is composed of four Heras or royal houses namely Hera Andal- the seat of Etherian power and home of Ether's temple, Hera Volo- the royal house of Etheria's military, Hera Sensa- the royal house of mind benders and Hera Ae-ga- the royal house of emotion bending Amazons.

Territories
 Askano – A territory in the northernmost part of Sapiro; home of the barbaros.
 Adjantao -A territory between Lireo and Sapiro; home of individuals called mandirigma (scavengers/warriors) who do not recognize the Queen of Lireo.
 Avila/Avalon – A territory between Hathoria and Sapiro; home of the winged creatures called Mulawin.
 Carcero – A sub-territory in the northernmost part of Lireo and Sapiro, bounded by Adjantao and Askano in the west. It serves as prison to lock-up Lireans who committed crimes. It's guarded around by bakunawas (sea serpents).
 Ayleb – A sub-territory within the north of Lireo introduced in the 2016 series, which served as a refugee camp and hide-out to the escaped prisoners of Carcero including Adhara and Lilasari.
 Nymfas – A territory introduced in the 2016 series where Deshna, daughter of Hagorn was brought for safe keeping. They are home to treemans who can climb and reach the highest trees.
Gunikars - The territory is located in the most mysterious land of Adamya. It is the Adamyan tribe who masters in assassination and parkour. They are the ninjas of Encantadia. 
 Hera Sensa – A sub-territory in the Kingdom of Etheria. Home of the ruthless Etherians, ghoul hunters, two to five-eyed psychics, priestesses, scholars, mind readers and controllers, witches, predicters, transmogrifiers, and clairvoyants.
 Hera Andal – Center of monarch in the Kingdom of Etheria, houses the throne of greedy villain Queen Avria and Etherian nobles, witches, and sorcerers. Known for their dark sorcery, soul manipulation, spells, potions, poisons, mystic dark chants, and healing abilities.
 Hera Aega – A sub-territory in the Kingdom of Etheria. Home of the ruthless Etherian warriors, scribes, hunters, and amazons who wield magical bow and arrows which can manipulate emotions. They are the most mysterious tribe in Encantadia.
 Hera Volo – A sub-territory in the Kingdom of Etheria. Home of the ruthless and diabolical Etherian warriors, allurers, flyers, and Etherian militaries that can manipulate time and speed. They possess unique and rare culture along with Andal. They perform mystic dance and chants to their evil Bathaluman.
 Punjabwes - A renegade tribe found in a remote territory of Sapiro. They possess unique capabilities that make them a formidable enemy. They are the pirates of Encantadia. They are burglars among with Mandirigmas that masters mechanical technology that is more advanced than Hathorians. They can entertain anyone through their dances, songs, and colorful performances. It houses the scheming and vicious Prince Manik, the sole warrior Azulan, and Ariana, the sarkosi of Hara Amihan II.

The Gems
The world of Encantadia is powered and guarded by a powerful gem called Inang Brilyante (mother gem) created by Cassiopeia, the first Queen of Lireo. The gem has powerful characteristics and abilities, and is considered as the most powerful relic in Encantadia. Many encantados covet the gemstone in an attempt to rule the realm, driving Cassiopeia to break it into four elemental gems that hold balance to the realm: fire, air, water and earth. She then handed them to the four kingdoms of Encantadia for safekeeping. However, King Arvak of Hathoria, consumed by greed, desired to acquire all the gems, so he used the fire gemstone he protected as a weapon in his war to conquer Encantadia. In the ensuing war, Arvak was killed and Prince Raquim of Sapiro was able to recover the fire and water gem from King Arvak, and decided to bring the two gems, along with Sapiro's earth gem, to Lireo for safekeeping. Since then, the four powerful gems are guarded by Queen Minea of Lireo who then hands them to her four daughters: Pirena, the keeper of the fire gem; Amihan, the air gem; Alena, the water gem; and Danaya, the earth gem. In the reboot a fifth gem is introduced as a small shard of the mother gem. When the mother gem is destroyed, the fifth gem is thrown to the sea shore where a lost mortal becomes its keeper.

Fire Gem (Brilyante ng Apoy) – The gem grants its owner the power to control fire, warmth and light. In this sense, the beholder can intensify sunlight and conjure fire. This gem has the ability of shapeshifting into another person. It can also create volcanic eruptions.
Air Gem (Brilyante ng Hangin) – The gem grants its owner the power to control the air, wind and coldness. In this sense, the beholder can change air currents, conjure oxygen in areas without it and transform into the air itself. It also grants the holder the ability to fly and shapeshift into wind. The gem can also be employed in detecting the presence of nearby beings by tracing the sound of their breaths.
Water Gem (Brilyante ng Tubig) – The gem grants its keeper the power to control water. It enhances its keeper's strength and enables the person to control biosonar, liquids and sea creatures. It also enables its keeper to summon rain and portray an image through water.
Earth Gem (Brilyante ng Lupa) – The gem grants its owner earth-based powers, enabling the person to control the earth, vegetation and nature. In this sense, the beholder can conjure earthquakes, communicate with plants and animals, shapeshift into any flora and fauna and heal herself. Without the presence of the gem of earth, plants would wilt, animals would die, and beings in Encantadia would weaken.
Spirit Gem (Brilyante ng Diwa) - In the 2016 series, a fifth gem, also called Brilyante ng Diwa (Gem of Spirit) was introduced as a result of a fragment from Cassiopeia's intense breakage of the Mother gem. Its powers and abilities are all the abilities of the four gemstone and has power to give life and control spirits and the spirit realm
Purple Gem (Brilyanteng Lila) - Also in the 2016 series, a sixth gem Brilyanteng Lila (Purple Gem) was also introduced, a cube shaped amethyst used by Emre to tempt Lira with power, along with riches. He said that the sixth gem has equal power to the first five gems. It has the power of balance of nature. The first five gems are to create and maintain, the final gem is for destruction and rebirth. Its powers is to balance all the works (anti-matter) of all the other gems. Lira declined the gem and was kept until now by Emre. This gem is not part of the Inang Brilyante (Mother Gem).

Enchanta
Encantadia uses a fictional language called Enchanta. It was created and conceptualized by Suzette Doctolero to make the viewers feel that the world of Encantados be somehow realistic and genuine. Doctolero created its vocabulary from many Indo-European languages with some influences of Philippine languages especially Tagalog. It can be traced from words like "corre", to love (from the root "cor" meaning heart) and "avoya", to travel (voyage). The language is also notable as it sounds like its from a European country because of the tone and the phonotactics. Most characters from the Encantadia saga know how to speak Enchanta, but it was Cassiopeia that had spoken the language most in the whole series, from the fact that she is the first diwata (fairy) of Lireo and ancestor of all the royal-blooded diwatas.

Wars in Encantadia
Throughout its history, Encantadia is plagued by four major conflicts that threatened the peace of the realm.

Main series

Encantadia (2005)

Queen Minea is the ruler of Lireo and she lives with her daughters Amihan, Alena, Danaya, and Pirena, who are collectively called the Sangg'res who are tasked with protecting the four elemental gemstones that bring harmony and peace to the realm of Encantadia. Everything changed when Pirena, Minea's eldest daughter, consumed by greed and jealousy, revolts against her half sister Amihan who has been chosen by their mother as the new Queen of Lireo instead of her. This provokes Pirena to give away the fiery gemstone she protected to her biological father Hagorn, ruler of the fiery Kingdom of Hathoria. With the fire gemstone in Hagorn's hands, he and Pirena wage war against the kingdoms of Encantadia to conquer the realm. Amidst the raging War of the Four Gems, Lira, the lost daughter of Amihan, returns to Encantadia to try to mend the broken relationships of the strong-willed Sangg'res and restore peace to the realm.

Etheria (2005–06)

In ancient times, there existed a great empire called Etheria, ruled by Reyna Avria, who ruled the small petty kingdoms of Lireo, Sapiro, Adamya and Hathoria with an iron fist. The four kingdoms soon banded together and defeated Etheria in the Great Encantadian War. When Etheria fell, Avria swore that Etheria would return to power once the last Sang'gre is born. The prophecy is eventually fulfilled with the birth of Cassandra. Etheria rose again from the ashes and in order to save the present, the four Sang'gres of Lireo travelled to the past, in ancient Encantadia, to find the lost Sangg're and destroy the Ginintuang Orasan (Etheria's powerful weapon) to stop Avria's centuries-old plan to dominate the realm.

Encantadia: Pag-ibig Hanggang Wakas (2006)

After stopping the return of Etheria in the previous season, Pirena, Amihan, Alena (now Queen of Sapiro) and Danaya (now Queen of Lireo), along with King Ybrahim of Sapiro, confront the vengeful Four Herans of the Etherian Kingdom.

Encantadia (2016)

A reboot of the original TV series but with new storylines and elements from the second series.

Spin-offs

Mulawin: The Movie (2005)

Pirena uses the "gintong binhi"(golden seed) to bring Ravenum back to life. Ravenum summons the dragon Buwarka and raises an army of Ravenas to wreak havoc on Avila territory. With the power of Mulawin's "Tree of Life" dwindling down and the Mulawin race in peril, the Diwatas of Encantadia and the Tres Aves (a legendary trio of heroes with special abilities) rushed to aid the Mulawin. The Mulawins and the Lireo soldiers led by Ybarro/Ybrahim faces the Ravenas until they defeated them. They return to Avila after a victory and a deadly battle. Aguiluz is seen lying in a royal bed in Lireo with Queen Amihan putting the "gintong binhi" to his mouth that can get his life back.

Sang'gre (2024)
The spin-off was revealed through an omnibus plug of GMA-7’s upcoming 2022 shows aired during the Kapuso New Year Countdown on December 31, 2021. According to a press release by GMA Network, Sang’gre is about a girl who manifests magical superpowers without knowing that she is the only daughter of Danaya, the youngest among the four Sang’gre sisters and the keeper of the earth gem.The series will be directed again by Mark Reyes and the creative team includes Encantadia creator Suzette Doctolero, veteran screenwriter Ricky Lee, and writers Anna Aleta Nadela, Jake Somera, and Ays de Guzman. Creative head RJ Nuevas and Ali Nokom-Dedicatoria were also mentioned in a post by Reyes.

Episodes

Broadcast
Encantadia series are broadcast by GMA Network in the Philippines and through its international subsidiaries like GMA Pinoy TV in other countries. The 2005 series' broadcasts in Malaysia began in 2012 through Astro Bella and was subbed in English language. In 2014, the first two series were made available in ASEAN countries such as Philippines, Malaysia, Brunei, Vietnam, Myanmar, Laos, Thailand, Singapore and Indonesia through Fox Filipino, a subsidiary of Fox Broadcasting Company. All of the first three series including the spin-off film are made available as video on demand on iflix and HOOQ in 2015. The 2016 series is also made available exclusively on iFlix as 1080p video on demand wherein new episodes are uploaded a day after its airing in GMA Network. According to iFlix manager Sherwin Dela Cruz, "we are hugely proud to support the Philippines’ exceptionally talented local entertainment industry. Encantadia has an incredible legacy, which we are honored to be a part of..." The said series can be streamed online through iFLix in the Philippines, Malaysia, Thailand, Indonesia, and Sri Lanka.

Cast and characters

Here are the list of recurring characters in the Encantadia franchise from 2005 to present, limited to major and minor roles as described. This table does not include cameos.
{|class="wikitable" style="text-align:center; width:99%;"
|-
! rowspan="2" style="width:15%;"|Character
! colspan="5" style="text-align:center;"| GMA Network series
|-
! style="width:10.63%;"|Encantadia(2005)
! style="width:10.63%;"|Etheria(2005–2006)
! style="width:10.63%;"|Encantadia(2006)! style="width:10.63%;"|Encantadia(2016-2017)
!Sang'gre(2024)
|-
!Mine-a
|Dawn Zulueta
|Nadine Samonte
|Dawn Zulueta
|Marian Rivera
|rowspan="87" 
|-
!Sang'gre Amihan I
|colspan="3" style="background:#d3d3d3;"| 
||Max Collins
|-
!Sang'gre Amihan
|colspan="3"|Iza Calzado
|Kylie Padilla
|-
!Sang'gre Pirena
|colspan="3"|Sunshine Dizon
|Glaiza de Castro
|-
!Sang'gre Alena
|colspan="3"|Karylle
|Gabbi Garcia
|-
!Sang'gre Danaya
|colspan="3"|Diana Zubiri
|Sanya Lopez
|-
!Ybarro/Ybrahim
|colspan="3"|Dingdong Dantes
|Ruru Madrid
|-
!Lira/Milagros
|Jennylyn Mercado
|style="background:#d3d3d3;"|
|Jennylyn Mercado
|Chlaui Malayao(young)Mikee Quintos
|-
!Mira
|Yasmien Kurdi
|style="background:#d3d3d3;"|
|Yasmien Kurdi
|Kate Valdez
|-
!Kahlil
|Jake Cuenca
|colspan="2" style="background:#d3d3d3;"|
||Avery Paraiso
|-
!Cassandra
|colspan="2" style="background:#d3d3d3;"|
|Ella Guevara(young)Precious Lara Quigaman
|-
!Hagorn
|Pen Medina
|Ping Medina
|Pen Medina
|John Arcilla
|-
!Agane
|Leila Kuzma
|style="background:#d3d3d3;"|
|Leila Kuzma
|Rochelle Pangilinan
|-
!Anthony
||Phytos Ramirez(young)Mark Herras
|style="background:#d3d3d3;"|
|style="background:#d3d3d3;"|
|Migo AdecerAndy Smith (adult)
|-
!Apek
|colspan="3"|Michael Roy Jornales
|style="background:#d3d3d3;"|
|-
!Aquil
||Alfred Vargas
|BJ Forbes
|Alfred Vargas
|Rocco Nacino
|-
!Hitano
|Polo Ravales
|style="background:#d3d3d3;"|
|Polo Ravales
|Pancho Magno
|-
!Muros
|colspan="3"|Arthur Solinap
|Carlo Gonzales
|-
!Wantuk
|colspan="3"|Marky Lopez
|Buboy Villar
|-
!Cassiopeia
|Cindy Kurleto
|Empress Schuck (young)
|Cindy Kurleto
|Solenn Heussaff
|-
!Ornia
|style="background:#d3d3d3;"|
|Glydel Mercado
|colspan="2" style="background:#d3d3d3;"|
|-
!Memen
|style="background:#d3d3d3;"|
|Tonton Gutierrez
|colspan="2" style="background:#d3d3d3;"|
|-
!Evades
|colspan="3"|Chinggoy Alonzo
|Ces Aldaba
|-
!Raquim
|Richard Gomez
|Dennis Trillo (young)
|style="background:#d3d3d3;"|
|Dingdong Dantes
|-
!Gurna
|Girlie Sevilla
|Aiza Marquez
|style="background:#d3d3d3;"|
|Vaness del Moral
|-
!Ades
|colspan="3" style="background:#d3d3d3;"|
|Ana Feleo
|-
!Asval
|Bobby Andrews
|Sid Lucero (young)
|style="background:#d3d3d3;"|
|Neil Ryan Sese
|-
!Muyak
|Nancy Castiglione
|colspan="2" style="background:#d3d3d3;"|
|Klea Pineda
|-
!Wahid
|colspan="3"|Benjie Paras
|Andre Paras
|-
!Apitong
|John Regala
|colspan="2" style="background:#d3d3d3;"|
|Christian Bautista
|-
!Amanda
|Irma Adlawan
|colspan="2" style="background:#d3d3d3;"|
|Angelu de Leon
|-
!Dado
|Allan Paule
|colspan="2" style="background:#d3d3d3;"|
|Leandro Baldemor
|-
!Bathalumang Ether
|colspan="3"|Angel Aquino
|Janice Hung
|-
!Bathalang Emre
|colspan="3"|Raymond Bagatsing
|Zoren Legaspi
|-
!Bathalang Arde
|style="background:#d3d3d3;"|
|Simon Ibarra
|style="background:#d3d3d3;"|
|a Dragon
|-
!Bathalang Keros
|colspan="3" style="background:#d3d3d3;"|
|Ian De Leon
|-
!Bathalumang Haliya
|colspan="3" style="background:#d3d3d3;"|
|Valeen Montenegro
|-
!Hara Avria
|style="background:#d3d3d3;"|
|colspan="2"|Francine Prieto
|Eula ValdezSolenn Heussaff(young)
|-
!Hera Andora
|style="background:#d3d3d3;"|
|colspan="2"|Alessandra de Rossi
|Rochelle Pangilinan
|-
!Hera Odessa
|style="background:#d3d3d3;"|
|colspan="2"|Pauleen Luna
|Sheree Bautista
|-
!Hera Juvila
|style="background:#d3d3d3;"|
|colspan="2"|Jopay Paguia
|Jinri Park
|-
!As'Nan
|style="background:#d3d3d3;"|
|colspan="2"|Rachelle Lobangco
|style="background:#d3d3d3;"|
|-
!Barkus
|style="background:#d3d3d3;"|
|Tirso Cruz III
|colspan="2" style="background:#d3d3d3;"|
|-
!Cilatus
|style="background:#d3d3d3;"|
|Daniel Fernando
|colspan="2" style="background:#d3d3d3;"|
|-
!Viktu
|style="background:#d3d3d3;"|
|Neil Ryan Sese
|colspan="2" style="background:#d3d3d3;"|
|-
!Bartimus
|style="background:#d3d3d3;"|
|Nonie Buencamino
|colspan="2" style="background:#d3d3d3;"|
|-
!Meno
|style="background:#d3d3d3;"|
|Gary Estrada
|colspan="2" style="background:#d3d3d3;"|
|-
!Banak
|colspan="3"|Pekto
|Not specified
|-
!Nakba
|colspan="3"|Rainier Castillo 
|Not specified
|-
!Imaw
|colspan="4"|Darren Zamudio
|-
!Awoo
|colspan="4"|Animatronic Puppet Only (a fictional species in the form of a camel-dog)
|-
!Arvak
|Al Tantay
|Michael Flores
|style="background:#d3d3d3;"|
|Roi Vinzon
|-
!Armeo
|Ian Veneracion
|colspan="2" style="background:#d3d3d3;"|
|Jestoni Alarcon
|-
!Asnara
|
|colspan="2" style="background:#d3d3d3;"|
|Jaycee Parker
|-
!Alira Naswen
|colspan="3" style="background:#d3d3d3;"|
|Julienne Lee
|-
!Dagtum
|Gerard Pizzaras
|colspan="2" style="background:#d3d3d3;"|
|Edwin Reyes
|-
!Axilom
|Brad Turvey
|colspan="3" style="background:#d3d3d3;"|
|-
!Mayca
|colspan="3" style="background:#d3d3d3;"|
|Cheska Iñigo
|-
!Kaizan
|colspan="3" style="background:#d3d3d3;"|
|Mara Alberto
|-
!Enuo
| style="background:#d3d3d3;"|
|Andrei Felix
| style="background:#d3d3d3;"|
|Rafa Siguion-Reyna
|-
!Rael
|colspan="3" style="background:#d3d3d3;"|
|Betong Sumaya
|-
!Pako
|colspan="3" style="background:#d3d3d3;"|
|James Teng
|-
!Icarus
|colspan="3" style="background:#d3d3d3;"|
|Ervic Vijandre
|-
!Pao-Pao
|colspan="3" style="background:#d3d3d3;"|
|Yuan FranciscoPhytos Ramirez
|-
!Vish'ka
|colspan="3" style="background:#d3d3d3;"|
|Conan Stevens
|-
!Ad'hara
|colspan="3" style="background:#d3d3d3;"|
|Sunshine Dizon
|-
!Pagaspas
|colspan="3" style="background:#d3d3d3;"|
|Miguel Tanfelix
|-
!Lakan
|colspan="3" style="background:#d3d3d3;"|
|Alden Richards
|-
!Avilan
|Romnick Sarmenta
|colspan="3" style="background:#d3d3d3;"|
|-
!Lilasari
|colspan="3" style="background:#d3d3d3;"|
|Diana Zubiri
|-
!Lanzu
|colspan="3" style="background:#d3d3d3;"|
|Maureen Larrazabal
|-
!Rexad
|colspan="3" style="background:#d3d3d3;"|
|Mike Lloren
|-
!Agua
|Sunshine Garcia
|colspan="2" style="background:#d3d3d3;"|
|Janine Gutierrez
|-
!Alipato
|Antonio Aquitania
|colspan="2" style="background:#d3d3d3;"|
| 
|-
!Sari-a
|Geneva Cruz
|colspan="2" style="background:#d3d3d3;"|
| 
|-
!Deshna/Luna
|colspan="3" style="background:#d3d3d3;"|
|Inah de Belen
|-
!Amarro
|style="background:#d3d3d3;"|
|Alfred Vargas
|style="background:#d3d3d3;"|
|Alfred Vargas
|-
!Gilas
|colspan="3" style="background:#d3d3d3;"|
|Jake Vargas
|-
!Helgad
|colspan="3" style="background:#d3d3d3;"|
|Winwyn Marquez
|-
!Azulan 
|colspan="2" style="background:#d3d3d3;"|
|Jay R
|Marx Topacio
|-
!Manik
|colspan="3" style="background:#d3d3d3;"|
|Joross Gamboa
|-
!Ariana 
|colspan="3" style="background:#d3d3d3;"|
|Arra San Agustin
|-
!Rosas
|colspan="2" style="background:#d3d3d3;"|
|Marnie Lapuz
|Via Antonio
|- 
!Memfes 
|colspan="3" style="background:#d3d3d3;"|
|Lance Serrano
|-
!Armea 
|colspan="1" style="background:#d3d3d3;"|
|Jackie Rice
|style="background:#d3d3d3;"|
|
|-
!Arman 
|colspan="1" style="background:#d3d3d3;"|
|Marky Cielo
|style="background:#d3d3d3;"|
|
|-
!Abog
|colspan="2" style="background:#d3d3d3;"|
|Lloyd Baredo
|Daniel Dasalla Bato
|}

In other media
Video games

A free mobile application game available in IOS and Android entitled Encantadia Blast was released in 2016. It was presented by GMA Network's subsidiaries, GMA New Media and Digify as part of the Encantadia franchise, the first mobile game in the Philippines inspired by a series. As of September 2016, the mobile app has been downloaded 100,000 times in Android phones with generally positive reviews. It features 80 levels, divided in four kingdoms with exclusive trivias flashing every after game. It is inspired by Candy Crush Saga with the use of the series' powerful gems.

Earlier in 2006, a non-free mobile game called Encantadia was released exclusively for Symbian/Java-capable devices, published by GetJar.

Home media
On March 4, 2008, GMA records released the episodes of the 2005 series of Encantadia on DVD with 160 episodes divided into 12 volumes of DVDs. Jason John Lim, former head of GMA records in 2005 stated in an interview that the DVD was released due to public demands specially for viewers overseas.

Merchandise
On December 24, 2016, series of photos of different Encantadia collectible items has been uploaded on Instagram by the director and casts including jackets, mugs, stickers, notebooks and caps during their Christmas party held at Riverside Studions, Manila. On December 25, it was announced that official merchandise for the series will be available in January 2017.

In popular culture
An Encantadia parody has also been featured in a comedy show, Bubble Gang'' under GMA Network in 2005 entitled as "Pinkantadia". The parody was inspired by the 2005 series including the sequel, Etheria. The said spoof featured comedy actors, Michael V., Wendell Ramos, Antonio Aquitania and Ara Mina. In 2016–2017, another spoof from Bubble Gang arose and known as "Engkantodo" which depicts hunger. The said spoof featured comedy actors Michael V, Sef Cadayona, Antonio Aquitania, Paolo Contis, Betong Sumaya, Boy2 Quizon, Max Collins, Jackie Rice, and Valeen Montenegro. Rice was the former Rehav Armea in the original series while Collins played Sang'gre Amihan and Montenegro played Bathalumang Haliya in the new series.

References

External links
 Encantadia (2005) official website
 Etheria official website
 Encantadia: Pag-ibig Hanggang Wakas official website
 Encantadia (2016) official website
 Encantadia 2016 official Instagram
 
 
 
 
 
 Encantadia Blast on Google Play

 
Mass media franchises introduced in 2005
Television shows adapted into films
Television shows adapted into video games
Military fiction
Fiction about magic
GMA Network drama series
Fantaserye and telefantasya